Robert Luke McBrian Florence (born 29 July 1977) is a Scottish presenter, comedian and writer who starred in the BBC comedy sketch show Burnistoun.

Early life
Robert Florence was born on 29 July 1977 and was raised in a working-class family in Balornock, Glasgow. His father and brothers are roofers.

He and future writing collaborator Iain Connell met as a pair of fifteen-year-olds at a Springburn amateur youth theatre project, Toonspeak. His sole stage appearance was at a stand-up comedy night in Petershill, Springburn, for which he dressed up as David Bowie. Florence spent a year on a film and television studies course at Cardonald College.

Career
He was a core writer of the sketch show Chewin' the Fat and with Iain Connell wrote the sitcom series Legit and Empty. Connell and Florence have recently worked on the third series of Burnistoun, which is set in a fictional Scottish city. The first series was shown on BBC 2 Scotland in early 2010; the second was shown on BBC 1 Scotland in early 2011 and the third began in August 2012. Florence has also been a performer on Frankie Boyle's Tramadol Nights for Channel 4.

Florence also makes an online show about boardgames called DowntimeTown and is the writer/performer/editor/creator of a review show for Xbox Live called The Independent Charles Show (sometimes purposefully misspelled The Independint Charles Show). Cardboard Children was a regular feature on boardgames that Florence contributed to UK-based PC gaming blog Rock, Paper, Shotgun between 2010 and 2016.

Personal life
Florence is a Celtic supporter. In June 2013, he lost to Greg Hemphill in a professional wrestling contest at the Kelvin Hall which served as the venue's final act before closing down.

Credits

Television
Chewin' the Fat (writer)
Velvet Soup (writer)
Live Floor Show (writer)
videoGaiden (writer/actor/presenter)
Legit (writer)
Charlie Brooker's Screenwipe (guest appearance)
The Karen Dunbar Show (writer)
Watson's Wind Up (writer)
Velvet Cabaret (writer)
Empty (writer)
Revolver (writer)
Charlie Brooker's Gameswipe (guest appearance)
Burnistoun (actor/writer)
Mock the Week (writer)
Frankie Boyle's Tramadol Nights (actor/writer)
Enlighten Up! (writer/actor)
The Sunny (writer/actor)
The Scotts (actor/writer)
GamesMaster (presenter/creative consultant)
Queen of the New Year (actor/writer)

Films
The House of Him (2014)

Online series
consolevania (writer/actor/presenter)
DowntimeTown (writer/actor/presenter)
The Independint Charles Show (Xbox LIVE) (writer/actor/presenter)

Print and online writing
GamesTM (guest writer)
Disposable Media (guest columnist)
Custom PC (columnist)
Rock, Paper, Shotgun (columnist)
Eurogamer.net (columnist)

References

External links
Robert Florence on Twitter — Robert Florence's Twitter feed.
DowntimeTown - The official website of Robert Florence's online boardgame show, DowntimeTown.
consolevania.com — The official website of Robert Florence and Ryan Macleod's online videogame series, Consolevania.
videoGaiden — BBC Scotland's website for Robert Florence and Ryan Macleod's BBC2 videogame series, videoGaiden.
Cardboard Children - Florence's board game feature for Rock, Paper, Shotgun

Living people
Scottish people of Irish descent
Scottish television writers
Scottish television presenters
People from Springburn
1977 births
Scottish male comedians
Comedians from Glasgow
British male television writers